The 31st Yukon Legislative Assembly convened in 2002, after the victory of the Yukon Party led by Dennis Fentie in the 2002 Yukon general election. The Yukon Party formed the territorial government, Dennis Fentie became the premier, and Ted Staffen became the speaker.

Membership in the 31st Assembly
The following members were elected to the 31st Yukon Legislative Assembly in the general election of November 4, 2002:

Standings changes after the 2002 general election

Membership changes

By-elections 
A by-election was held in the district of Copperbelt in 2005:

References

External links
Yukon Legislature

Yukon Legislative Assemblies
Lists of people from Yukon
Yukon politics-related lists